Justin Thompson (born January 9, 1981 in Prince Rupert, British Columbia) is a Canadian retired soccer defender who played professionally in the United States, Canada and England.  He was a member of the Canada U-20 men's national soccer team at the 2001 FIFA World Youth Championship.

Career

College
Thompson played college soccer for Fairfield University in Fairfield, Connecticut from 2001 to 2003, where he captained the Stags during his final two years. In 2002, the NSCAA selected him as a Regional All-American.

Professional
Thompson started his career with Bury in England, and spent the next few years bouncing backward and forward from the UK to North America across the summer and winter seasons, from Vancouver Whitecaps to Hornchurch to Virginia Beach Mariners to Worcester City.  In two seasons with Worcester City, Thompson made 73 league appearances. In total, he made 97 appearances in all competitions.  Thompson joined USL First Division side Portland Timbers in April 2007. On 3 December 2008, he returned to the Vancouver Whitecaps. On 31 March 2010, Thompson played his first game for West Van FC in the Imperial Cup.

International
Thompson was a member of Canada's U-18, U-20 and U-23 National Teams.  In 2001, he was a member of the Canadian U-20 team which finished first in Group A at the 2001 CONCACAF Under-20 Qualification Tournament to qualify for the 2001 FIFA World Youth Championship in Argentina.  Thompson made his Canadian Olympic (U-23) team debut in May 2002 and earned six caps with the team in 2004 Olympic qualifying matches.

Personal
Justin founded the ACT Sports Group in 2003 where he is involved in a number of soccer-related activities, including the organization of team tours from North America to Europe and the designing and overseeing of soccer camps in the UK, as well as the coordination of international professional player transfers. Thompson graduated with a B.S. in Finance from the Fairfield University Dolan School of Business.

References

External links

Portland Timbers bio

ACT-SPORTSGROUP
FIFA: Justin Thompson

1981 births
Living people
Bury F.C. players
Expatriate footballers in England
Canadian expatriate sportspeople in the United States
Canadian soccer players
Canadian expatriate soccer players
Fairfield Stags men's soccer players
Fairfield University Dolan School of Business alumni
Association football defenders
Hornchurch F.C. players
Portland Timbers (2001–2010) players
USL First Division players
Vancouver Whitecaps (1986–2010) players
Virginia Beach Mariners players
Worcester City F.C. players
People from Prince Rupert, British Columbia
Canada men's youth international soccer players
Canada men's under-23 international soccer players
Canadian expatriate sportspeople in England